Senator Summers may refer to:

Albert E. Summers (1824–1901), West Virginia State Senate
Charlie Summers (born 1959), Maine State Senate
Jacob Summers (1787–1863), Michigan State Senate
Lewis Summers (Virginian) (1778–1843), Ohio State Senate

See also
Heather Somers (born 1966), Connecticut State Senate
Senator Sommer (disambiguation)